= Kadabi =

- Village
- Country: India
- State: Karnataka
- District: Belgaum

Languages
  - Official: Kannada
- Time zone: UTC+5:30 (IST)
- Postal code: 591129
- Vehicle registration: KA 24

Kadabi is a village in Yaragatti Taluka, Belgaum district in the northern state of Karnataka, India.
